The Cairo Monorail is a two-line monorail rapid transit system currently under construction in Cairo, Egypt, which will be the longest driverless monorail system in the world. The two lines will create the first public transport links from the New Administrative Capital and 6th of October City to the Cairo metropolitan area when the project is complete. The 54km line connecting the New Administrative City with East Cairo will take 60 minutes, and the 42km line connecting 6th of October City with Giza will take 42 minutes.

The system is expected to first open to the public in 2023.

Routes

New Administrative Capital (East Nile) line
Due to begin operating in May 2022 but delayed until 2023.<

 long, with 22 stations including: Stadium, Hisham Barakat, Nouri Khattab, the 7th District, Free Zone, Marshal Tantawy, Cairo Festival, Air Hospital, Narjis District, Mohammed Naguib, American University, Emaar, Nafoura Square, Al Barwa, Middle Ring Road, Mohammed Bin Zayed, Regional Ring Road, Almasa Hotel, Ministries (Al Wezarat) District, and Administrative Capital and Station 22 (not yet Named).

The line will provide a transfer to the Cairo Metro Line 3 at its terminus in Stadium station. It will also be connected to the Cairo LRT at Almasa Hotel station (transfer to the Arts and Culture City station of the LRT).

6th of October City (West Nile) line
Projected to begin operating in February 2023.

 long, with 13 stations: New October Station, Industrial Zone Station, Sadat Station, Sixth of October City Authority Station, Engineers Association Station, Nile University Station, Hyper One station, Cairo-Alexandria Desert Road, Mansouriya Station, Mariouteya Station, Ring Road Station, Bashteel Station, and Nile Valley Station.

The line will provide a transfer to the Cairo Metro Line 3 at Nile Valley Station, part of the line's eastern expansion plans.

Rolling stock

Cairo Monorail was to use 70 fully automated, driverless Bombardier Innovia Monorail 300 vehicles for the two lines with four cars each. The rolling stock has been manufactured at Derby Litchurch Lane Works in England.

See also 
 Cairo Metro
 Urban rail transit in Africa
 List of monorail systems
 High-speed rail in Egypt

References

+
Rapid transit in Egypt
Rail transport in Egypt
Proposed monorails
2023 in rail transport
Driverless monorails